Gang Gyeong-hyo (born 23 November 1964), also known as Kang Kyung-hyo, is a South Korean modern pentathlete. He competed at the 1984 and 1988 Summer Olympics.

References

External links
 

1964 births
Living people
South Korean male modern pentathletes
Olympic modern pentathletes of South Korea
Modern pentathletes at the 1984 Summer Olympics
Modern pentathletes at the 1988 Summer Olympics
Korea National Sport University alumni
20th-century South Korean people